The Ford 302 H.O. is a high-performance "small block"  V8 engine manufactured by Ford Motor Company. The original version of this engine was used in the 1969 and 1970 Boss 302 Mustangs and Cougar Eliminators and was constructed by attaching heads designed for the planned 351 Cleveland (which debuted the following year) to a Ford small block. The construction was aided by the two engines sharing a cylinder head bolt pattern, though the Boss heads had to have their coolant passages slightly modified.

An entirely new Boss 302 engine was introduced for the 2012 Ford Mustang using a variant of the Ford Modular engine.

Design
The 1969–70 302 H.O. engine was developed in 1968 for the SCCA's 1969 Trans-Am road racing series. Fitted to the contemporary factory-made Boss 302 Mustangs, it is a unique Ford small-block featuring a thin-wall casting. It differed substantially from regular 302s, featuring four-bolt main bearings, screw-in freeze plugs, higher nickel content, and cylinder heads using a canted valve design developed for the 351C, which made its debut in late 1969 Mustangs.

The block had a thicker deck and a taller intake manifold due to the heads. It also had a distinct harmonic balancer, crankcase windage tray, bigger diameter alternator pulley (from the 289 HIPO), and bigger diameter power steering pulley all to accommodate the higher RPM capabilities of the engine vs a standard 302. While the standard 302 used six bolts on the valve cover, the Boss 302 has eight bolts. The valve cover was chromed in 1969 and changed in 1970 to cast aluminum. The connecting rods are the same as used in the 289 HIPO and have an engineering number of C3AE-D on them. They are capable of higher RPMs than standard 302 rods (up to ~8k RPM), aided by a spot face for  bolts with a unique football-shaped head (vs 5/16 for standard small blocks), and beefier cap. The crankshaft is cross-drilled with hollow crankshaft throws (this was changed in 1970 for better reliability) high strength steel forging. The cam and lifters are high lift, solid mechanical units.

The wide and large port heads with staggered valve placement give the 302 H.O. high power capabilities. Because of the pent-roof design of the heads, the Boss also had forged pop-up pistons to achieve the desired 10.5:1 compression ratio. Early units were typically characterized by very large intake  and exhaust  valves sitting in a small quench style combustion chamber. Exhaust valves were sodium-filled to aid cooling. Valve springs were dual units with an inner and outer spring to minimize harmonic resonance at high RPM. The heads feature steel spring seats, screw-in rocker studs, pushrod guide plates to aid in pushrod stability at high RPMs, and adjustable rocker arms. Fuel was provided by a Holley  manual choke carburetor. The taller intake required a thinner spacer. Ford used a phenolic spacer that incorporated an aluminum tube for the PCV hose and also helped isolate the carburetor from the heat of the intake. Ignition was handled by a dual point distributor firing unique  AF 32 Autolite spark plugs specified because of their smaller size ( wrench vs.  wrench) so as to fit within the tight confines of the combustion chamber alongside the very large valves.

The motor produces a unique sound as a result of its solid-lifter configuration. At idle, properly tuned, the engine produced a significant amount of 'chatter' noise.

It had a 6,150 RPM limit. The Boss 302 engine competes well with other high performance 'small blocks', such as the Chevy 302, the Chrysler 340, and the AMC 360.

The "Boss" in the Boss 302's name came from original designer Larry Shinoda's reference to Bunkie Knudsen, the CEO at Ford and an outspoken proponent of the car's development, who told his designers, "I want to design a car that's the coolest Mustang out there. I don't want somebody else's name on it, like a Shelby." Boss 302 is the name of the car (the engine is the 302 H.O.) but it also became popular to call this specific engine the Boss 302.

This engine was also optional in the Mercury Cougar Eliminator, with a total of 169 produced in 1969 and 469 assembled in 1970.

New Boss 302 (2007-)

The new Boss 302 engine was unveiled in the 2006 SEMA show.

The double overhead cam, variable valve timing  Ford Modular "Coyote-Boss" engine is also marketed as a crate engine by Ford Racing.

Additional Information
The Boss 302 engine may be confused with the 302 Cleveland Ford small block engine, which was produced by Ford Australia. The 302 Cleveland is a (4.9L) engine that was exclusively made in Australia from 1971 to 1982 (see Ford 335 engine).

The Boss 302 and 302 Cleveland may also be commonly referred to as the 5.0 Liter or 302 5.0. This may have been to distinguish the engines from the 300 cu Ford straight-six engine, otherwise known as the 4.9L. Another possible reason for the 5.0 Liter title may be to separate the two similar engines from the 4.6 Liter series which came as a 302 as well as 289 and 351.

Windsor and Cleveland, Boss difference 
The Ford small block engine or Windsor V8 is the series of engines the Boss 302 derived from. The original line of 302w engines was manufactured from 1969 to 1970. From 1968 to 1970, the engines were manufactured in Windsor, Ontario, and would be the base architecture of the Boss 302, commonly called the 302w. In 1969, the manufacturing location of the Boss 302 changed to Cleveland, Ohio. After the location change, adjustments were made to the design of the Boss 302. The 1969 - 1970 Boss 302 engines shared the same heads as the Boss 351, (351C-4V canted valve). These heads were modified for the solid mechanical cams the Boss 302 and Boss 351 engine would come with. Adjustable rocker studs, new long slot rockers and closed 62cc combustion chamber heads were used. This changed 302 engine would go on to be exclusively made in Australia from 1971 to 1982 (see Ford 335 engine). These exclusive engines are called the 302 Cleveland.

The Boss engine, because it's a variant of the Windsor 302. The difference between the canted valve Cleveland head 302 and the inline valve Windsor 302 is that the Cleveland used the base Windsor 302s short-block, and adds the unique Boss 302 heads to it. The Boss 302 block, designed for racing is 4-bolt main on the center three caps, made from high nodular iron, the same type as the 289 Hi-Po engine.  The cylinder bores are notched slightly on the top to clear the big 2.19 Intake valves.  This required a new head gasket for the Boss engines.  The Rods are beefed-up versions of the 302. They are longer and share the same length as the 289 at 5.155 vs 5.09 for the 302w. The Boss engine used a steel crankshaft as well.  And all Boss 302 and 351's came with a windage tray to skim oil away from the rotating parts for more horsepower. The canted Valve Boss engines use a piston specifically notched for the canted valve heads.  Pistons are not interchangeable between a 302w and a Boss (cleveland head) engine.  The 351s heads allowed the Boss 302 to have a significant increase in airflow because of its canted or angled valves.  In the canted valve heads the intake and exhaust valves are rotated so the intake valves are closer to the valley, providing a slightly better path of air in and out of the bores.

See also
List of Ford engines

References

External links
BOSS 302 Cylinder Block instruction sheet
Boss 302 "Ford Remakes a Legend"

Boss 302
V8 engines
Gasoline engines by model